The Verkehrsverbund Rhein-Sieg (Rhine-Sieg Transport Association; VRS) is the public transport association covering the area of the Cologne/Bonn Region, North Rhine-Westphalia, Germany. 

It was founded on 1 September 1987, and covers an area of some 5.111 km² with some 3.3 million inhabitants. For the year 2009 nearly 494 million passengers were carried through the network of VRS. Verkehrsverbund Rhein-Sieg is named after the rivers Rhine (Rhein) and Sieg.

Associated transport companies

Selected cities and parishes in the VRS area

References

External links 
 vrsinfo.de - official site 
 www.mobil-im-rheinland.de 

Transport in Cologne
Transport in North Rhine-Westphalia
Transport companies established in 1987
Companies based in Cologne
Transport associations in Germany
1987 establishments in West Germany